The Old Courthouse at 1207 Caldwell St. in Newberry, South Carolina was built in 1852.  It was listed on the National Register of Historic Places in 1971.

References

Courthouses on the National Register of Historic Places in South Carolina
County courthouses in South Carolina
Greek Revival architecture in South Carolina
Government buildings completed in 1852
Buildings and structures in Newberry County, South Carolina
National Register of Historic Places in Newberry County, South Carolina
Newberry, South Carolina
1852 establishments in South Carolina